Johann von Michelsohnen (tr. ; 3 May 1740 – 17 August 1807) was a Baltic-German military commander who served in the Imperial Russian Army. He was a prominent general in several wars, but his most noted contribution was his critical role in suppressing Pugachev's Rebellion.

Biography 

Michelsohnen was born in Reval in the Governorate of Estonia to a family of noble rank. His early military career saw him serve as a cavalry officer in many conflicts: the Seven Years' War, the Russo-Turkish War of 1768–74, and the war against the Bar Confederation.

By the end of 1773 Michelsohnen held the rank of Lieutenant-Colonel of the Saint-Petersburg Regiment of Carabineers, and, after the new force arrived in rebel-occupied territory, was given command over a force of soldiers to fight against the rebels led by Yemelyan Pugachev, who by this time had gained a fearsome reputation and defeated several expeditions sent against him by the government. Soon enough events turned around due to Michelsohnen's exceptional resolve, especially his indefatigability when confronting followers of the rebellion, whom he crushed wherever he encountered them. His most decisive action was at the Battle of Kazan, where he led the relief force to the besieged city. By the time Michelson had arrived on July 13, Pugachev's army had already surrounded the city's Kremlin where the remaining defenders and loyal citizens had taken refuge. Michelsohnen launched a determined strike on the rebels, and thereafter pursued them across the right bank of the Volga River. He refused to relent, and as the rebels attempted to regroup near Tsaritsyn, drove his small army of under 5,000 men to engage Pugachev near Chyorny Yar on August 25, where he annihilated a force of 10,000 rebels, killing 2,000 and capturing 6,000 more, suffering only 90 casualties to his forces in the process. Michelsohnen had managed to end any major threat of the rebellion reemerging and assaulting the Russian interior.

For his services in suppressing the revolt, Catherine the Great awarded Michelsohnen with numerous honors: an estate in Vitebsk Governorate, the Gold Sword for Bravery with Diamonds, and the rank of full colonel. On 12 February 1775 Michelson has been given the Cross 3rd class of the Order of St. George (no mention of the Pugachev's uprising has been made in the decree). In 1775 he commanded the Military Order Cuirassier Regiment, then the Life-Cuirassier Regiment the following year. In 1778 he was promoted to major general, and awarded the Order of St. Alexander Nevsky, in 1781 he was given the honorary post of major in the Life-Guard Horse Regiment, and in 1786 was made a lieutenant general.

With the outbreak of war against Sweden, Michelsohnen was given command of a corps in the army of General Valentin Platonovich Musin-Pushkin. In 1797 he was promoted to General of Cavalry. In 1803 he was given command of the Belorussian Military Governorate, managing the civil administration of Mogilev and Vitebsk Governorates. In 1805 he was entrusted with command over forces assembled on Russia's western borders, and the next year command over the Dnieper Army, destined for the campaign against the Turks. For successfully completing the first part of the campaign, he was awarded the Order of St. Andrew. While his army occupied Moldavia, General von Michelsohnen died suddenly at Bucharest. His body was transported back to Ivanovo (today in Pskov Oblast), the estate awarded to him by Empress Catherine after the Pugachev Rebellion. His grave was razed in the aftermath of the Russian Revolution.

References

Sources
 Списки воинскому департаменту, исправленные по 1771, 1776, 1779, 1780б 1781, 1782, 1783, 1784, и т. д. гг.
Военно-походный журнал командира карательного корпуса подполковника Михельсона И. И. о боевых действиях против повстанцев в марте — августе 1774 г. // Крестьянская война 1773—1775 гг. в России. Документы из собрания Государственного исторического музея. — М.: Наука, 1973. — С. 194—223.
Ореус И. И. Иван Иванович Михельсон, победитель Пугачева. 1740—1807 // Русская старина, 1876. — Т. 15, № 1. — С. 192—209.
Серков А. И. Русское масонство. 1731—2,000 (Энциклопедический словарь). — М.: РОССПЭН, 2001.
Additional information taken from the Brockhaus and Efron Encyclopedic Dictionary (1890—1907).

1740 births
1807 deaths
People from Tallinn
People from the Governorate of Estonia
Baltic-German people
Baltic German people from the Russian Empire
Imperial Russian Army generals
Pugachev's Rebellion
Russian military personnel of the Seven Years' War
People of the Russo-Turkish War (1768–1774)